Jubail Industrial College  is a technical college in Saudi Arabia established in 1989 by the Royal Commission for Jubail and Yanbu, in Jubail Industrial City on the coast of the Arabian Gulf.

JIC offers academic programs, including diploma, bachelor's, and master's degrees, in engineering, business administration, and computer science. The college also offers technical training and vocational education programs in areas such as welding, electrical technology, and mechanical technology.

Departments and majors 
There are six departments at Jubail Industrial college.

External links 
 

Universities and colleges in Saudi Arabia
Jubail
1989 establishments in Saudi Arabia
Educational institutions established in 1989